John Legh may refer to:

John Legh (18th century MP) for Bodmin
John Legh (14th century MP) for Surrey

See also
John Leigh (disambiguation)